Barbara Mallory Caraway (born May 8, 1956) is an American politician who served as a member of the Texas House of Representatives for the 110th district from 2007 to 2013.

Early life and education 
Born in Clarksville, Texas, Mallory Caraway was raised in Amarillo, the fifth born of eight children. She has lived in the Dallas area for more than 22 years. She earned a Bachelor of Arts degree in telecommunications and theatre from Texas Southern University.

Career
Mallory Caraway served as a member of the Dallas City Council for the sixth district from 1993 to 2001 until term limits forced her to retire. She is also a former Democratic precinct chair.

Mallory Caraway was elected to the Texas House of Representatives on November 7, 2006. In November 2008, she was re-elected to a second term. House District 110 includes the Dallas areas of Singing Hills, Southeast Oak Cliff, including the Cedar Crest Addition, parts of Pleasant Grove and the City of Seagoville. Mallory Caraway served on the Public Safety Committee and the Urban Affairs Committee. Her husband, Dwaine Caraway, served on the city's Park Board and was later elected to the city council.

Career Futures Initiative
Mallory Caraway introduced the Career Futures Initiative in 2007 to address low scores in math and science by giving high school students first-hand knowledge and practical experience in the fields of math, science, engineering and technology.

Congressional elections 
Mallory Caraway lost Democratic primary runs for Texas's 30th congressional district against incumbent Congresswoman Eddie Bernice Johnson in 2012, 2014, 2016, 2018 and 2020.

Personal life
She is married to Dwaine Caraway, a Dallas City Council member and former acting mayor of Dallas. She has a stepdaughter and two granddaughters. Mallory Caraway is a member of the National Conference of State Legislators, the National Foundation of Women Legislators, the Cedar Crest Neighborhood Association, and is a member of Camp Wisdom United Methodist Church.

References

External links
Texas House of Representatives - Barbara Mallory Caraway
Campaign website
 

1956 births
Living people
Democratic Party members of the Texas House of Representatives
People from Clarksville, Texas
Texas Southern University alumni
Women state legislators in Texas
African-American state legislators in Texas
African-American women in politics
21st-century American politicians
21st-century American women politicians
20th-century Methodists
21st-century Methodists
American United Methodists
African-American Methodists
Candidates in the 2022 United States House of Representatives elections